The British Consulate General in Jerusalem is the British High Diplomatic Representation in the occupied Palestinian Territories. The consulate is located in the Sheikh Jarrah neighborhood of Jerusalem.

In February 2021, the British Consul-General in Jerusalem, Philip Hall, condemned settlements in the Israeli-occupied territories as "illegal and an obstacle to restarting peace talks" between Israel and Palestine.

Consuls list

Philip Hall, from 2016 to 2021.
Diane Corner, since July 14, 2021.

Notes

References

External links
 Consulate website

United Kingdom
Palestine
State of Palestine–United Kingdom relations